Bruno Pinheiro may refer to:

 Bruno Pinheiro (football manager) (born 1976), Portuguese football manager for Estoril
 Bruno Pinheiro (footballer) (born 1987), Portuguese football centre-back